Yugambeh (or Mibanah, from ,  'language of men' or 'sound of eagles'), also known as Tweed-Albert Bandjalang, is an Australian Aboriginal language spoken by the Yugambeh living in South-East Queensland between and within the Logan River basin and the Tweed River basin, bounded to the east by the Pacific Ocean (including South Stradbroke Island) and in the west by the Teviot Ranges and Teviot Brook basin.

Yugambeh is dialect cluster of four dialects, one of four such clusters of the Bandjalangic branch of the Pama–Nyungan language family. A poorly attested variety called Ngarahgwal may belong to Yugambeh or to one of the other Bandjalang clusters.

Nomenclature
In the Yugambeh language, the word  means an emphatic 'no', 'never' i.e. 'very much no' and is a common exonym for the people and their language. Language speakers use the word  which means 'man', 'human', 'wedge-tailed eagle' and is the preferred endonym for the people; they call their language  meaning 'of man', 'of human', 'of eagle' (the  suffix forming the genitive of the word ).

Yugambeh may also be referred to as:
Yugambir, Yugambeh (Yugambal/Yugumbal was evidently a separate language located further west)
Yubumbee
Jugumbir, Jukamba
Tweed-Albert language
Nganduwal
Ngarangwal
Manaldjali (a variant of Mununjali, the name of a Yugambeh-speaking clan)
Minjanbal (probably from Minjungbal, an alternate language term)

Geographic distribution 

Yugambeh is spoken within the Logan, Albert, Coomera, Nerang, and Tweed River basins.

Phonology

Vowels 
Yugambeh has a vowel system of four vowels that also contrast in length, resulting in eight phonemic vowels in total. The letter "h" is used after the vowel to indicate a long vowel.

Allophones 
The low central vowel  is fronted and raised between palatal consonants and a lateral/rhotic consonant.

Consonants 
Compared to other Pama-Nyungan languages, Yugambeh has a smaller inventory of consonants. There are four places of articulation, with the consonants consisting of four obstruents, four nasals, two liquids, and two semivowels.

Obstruents

Obstruents do not have a voicing contrast, and can appear as fricative allophones. Obstruents are phonetically voiceless, except when following a homorganic consonant.

Grammar 
The grammar of the Yugambeh language is highly agglutinative, making use of over 50 suffixes on nouns, verbs, adjectives and demonstratives.

Syntax 
Syntax in the Yugambeh language is fairly free ordered, with a tendency towards SOV (subject–object–verb) structures. Adjectives and demonstratives part of noun phrases e.g. that man, a red car, stay adjacent to the noun they qualify.

Noun morphology 
Nouns take a number of suffixes to decline for grammatical case.

Suffixes 
Noun suffixes are placed into ten orders. A noun may not take more than one suffix from any order, and if more than one suffix is attached they must always be in the set order of the suffix orders, e.g. an order 7 suffix must always come after an order 5 suffix.

'X' stands for a homorganic obstruent.

'N' stands for a homorganic nasals.

#The comitative, purposive, desiderative, ablative and aversive suffixes are preceded by -bah on animate nouns.

 1st order suffixes
 -gali (typified by) – used to indicate an association or link
 Examples:
  'shoe' lit. 'typified by foot'
  'womaniser' lit. 'typified by women'
 2nd order suffixes
 -gan (feminine) – used to form feminine nouns and some astrological terms
 Examples:
  'female singer'
 3rd order suffixes
 -bur (diminutive) – used to form the diminutive of a noun, referring to a smaller version
 Examples:
  'toy boomerang'
 4th order suffixes
 -Nah (possessive) – indicates current possession
 Examples:
  'our'
  'of the moon/moon's'
 -Nahjil (past possessive) – indicates past possession
 Examples:
  'was of the parrot' (Billinudgel)

Verb morphology 
Verbs are conjugated with the use of suffixes. It is an aspect-dominant language, as opposed to tense-dominant like most Western languages. Yugambeh suffixes mostly conjugate for aspect and mood.

Suffixes 
Verb suffixes are placed in six orders. A verb may not take more than one suffix from an order, and similar to nouns, suffixes are attached in a set order. Combinations of these suffixes express all possible conjugations of Yugambeh verbs, with only a small number of combinations possible. Yugambeh verb stems are commonly two syllables in length and always in a vowel.

Adjective morphology 
Adjectives can be marked with a suffix to indicate the gender of the noun they qualify.

Suffixes 

*N stands for a homorganic nasal.

Demonstratives 
Yugambeh possesses a complicated set of demonstratives that make a three-way distinction, with proximal, medial, and distal sets. There is a further distinguishing of demonstrative adjectives and location demonstratives. The adjective set can be additionally suffixed to create demonstrative pronouns'. The adjective set has three forms for "things in sight", "things hidden or not in sight" and "things not there anymore", while the location set has forms to indicate the general area and definite area, whether in sight or not in sight, and past and present forms.

Adjective set 

The above set can be suffixed with order 7 noun suffixes to form demonstrative pronouns that function like ordinary independent nouns. e.g.  'Take this with you!'

The 'not in sight' and 'not here anymore' forms can take the order 2 noun suffix -gan to form time words. e.g.  'recently'.

Location set

App 
The Yugambeh Museum in Beenleigh currently maintains a free dictionary app for the Yugambeh language, available on Android, iOS and a desktop version.

Place names
Modern place names with roots in the Yugambeh language include:
 Jumpinpi – Pandanus root
 Tallebudgera – rotten or decayed logs

References

Further reading
 Dictionary of Yugambeh Including Neighbouring Dialects, compiled by Margaret Sharpe, Pacific Linguistics: Australian National University, 1998.

External links
Borobi and His Friends, virtual book, read in Yugambeh language by Axel Best. From the State Library of Queensland virtual book collection. (requires Adobe Flash)
 Linguist List (2005) Synopsis of ''Grammar and Texts of the Yugambeh-Bundjalung Dialect Chain in Eastern Australia Accessed 20 May 2008
 Yugambeh (South East Queensland - Logan, Gold Coast, Scenic Rim) Community Language Journey Digital Story, State Library of Queensland

Yugambeh–Bundjalung languages
South East Queensland